Harris David O'Connor is a Scottish professional footballer who plays as a defender for League One club Charlton Athletic.

Career

Early career
Having come through the ranks at both Charlton Athletic and Kilmarnock, O'Connor joined Rangers in the Scottish Premier League. On 10 March 2021, O'Connor joined Scottish League Two Brechin City on loan until the end of the season.

Charlton Athletic
O'Connor was released by Rangers and rejoined Charlton Athletic on 1 November 2021.

On 1 June 2022, O'Connor signed an extension to his contract at Charlton ahead of the 2022–23 season.

He made his debut for Charlton in a 3–0 EFL Trophy victory at home against Gillingham on 31 August 2022 where he started the game and played the first 67 minutes.

Hemel Hempstead Town (loan)
On 1 September 2022, O'Connor joined Hemel Hempstead Town on loan on 1 January 2023.

International career
O'Connor made his Scotland U16 debut against Poland U16s on 18 September 2017 and went on to earn seven caps at that level.

On 21 August 2018, O'Connor then made his U17 debut in a 2-0 victory over Russia U17s.

Career statistics

References

External links
 

Living people
Scottish footballers
Charlton Athletic F.C. players
Rangers F.C. players
Hemel Hempstead Town F.C. players
Association football forwards
English Football League players
National League (English football) players
2002 births